Democratic Left Youth (in Spanish: Juventudes de Izquierda Democrática) was the youth wing of the Democratic Left (ID) in Spain. JID existed at the time of the transition to democracy in 1977.

Youth wings of political parties in Spain